Elaphe moellendorffi, commonly called the flower snake or Moellendorf's [sic] rat snake, is a species of snake in the family Colubridae. The species is endemic to southeastern Asia.

Etymology
The specific name, moellendorffi, is in honor of German malacologist Otto Franz von Möllendorf.

Geographic range
E. moellendorffi is found in China (Guangdong, Guangxi) and Vietnam (Hòa Bình). It may possibly also occur in Laos.

Description
E. moellendorffi is a large snake.

Reproduction
E. moellendorffi is oviparous.

References

Further reading
Boettger O (1886). "Diagnoses Reptilium Novorum ab ill. viris O. Herz et Consule Dr. O. Fr. de Moellendorf in Sina meridionali reportorum ". Zoologischer Anzeiger 9: 519-520. (Cynophis moellendorffi, new species, p. 520). (in Latin).
Boulenger GA (1894). Catalogue of the Snakes in the British Museum (Natural History). Volume II., Containing the Conclusion of the Colubridæ Aglyphæ. London: Trustees of the British Museum (Natural History). (Taylor and Francis, printers). xi + 382 pp. + Plates I-XX. (Coluber moellendorffi, p. 56).
Chen, Xin; Lemmon, Alan R.; Lemmon, Emily Moriarty; Pyron, R. Alexander; Burbrink, Frank T. (2017). "Using phylogenomics to understand the link between biogeographic origins and regional diversification in ratsnakes". Molecular Phylogenetics and Evolution 111: 206-218.

Reptiles described in 1886
Reptiles of China
Reptiles of Vietnam
Elaphe
Snakes of China
Snakes of Vietnam
Snakes of Asia